Guillard is a surname, and may refer to:
 Charlotte Guillard, first woman printer of importance
 Georges Guillard (born 1939), French former holder of the Great Organ of the Notre-Dame church in Paris
 Marie Guillard (born 1972), French actress
 Melvin Guillard, American mixed martial artist
 Nicolas-François Guillard, French writer of operatic librettos
 Norma Guillard Limonta, Cuban social psychologist and researcher on gender, sexuality, race and identity
 Robert Guillard, French bobsledder

See also 
 Huillard

fr:Guillard